The Lantern is a 1925 Czech film directed by Karel Lamač and starring Theodor Pištěk and Anny Ondra. It is based on a play by Alois Jirásek. Lamač made a remake with the same name in 1938.

Cast
 Theodor Pištěk as Miller Libor
 Anny Ondra as Orphan Hanička
 Karel Lamač as Teacher Josef Zajíček
 Andula Sedláčková as Countess
 Lo Marsánová as Dornička
 Jaroslav Vojta as Carpenter Braha
 Václav Srb as Musician Klásek
 Antonie Nedošinská as Kačenka Klásková
 Ferenc Futurista as Vodník Ivan
 Eman Fiala as Vodník Michal
 Jan W. Speerger as Mr. Franc

References

External links

1920s fantasy films
Films based on works by Alois Jirásek
Films directed by Karel Lamač
Czechoslovak black-and-white films
Czech fantasy films
Czech silent feature films